"Closer to You" (Stylized as Closer to you) is a song recorded by South Korean duo Exo-SC, the second official sub-unit of the South Korean boy group Exo. It was released on July 22, 2019 by SM Entertainment as one of the three title tracks of their first extended play What a Life.

Background and release 
"Closer to You" is a hip hop song with a romantic sensibility. It's described as an impressive song with an emotional melody and a highly addictive chorus with lyrics about expressing the desire to be closer to the person. Chanyeol and Sehun participated in writing the lyrics with hip hop group Rhythm Power's member Hangzoo.

On July 31, a cam video of the two members separately of their performance of "Closer to You" on their showcase were released.

Music video 
On July 18, a teaser of "Closer to You" was released along with the other two title tracks of What a Life EP. On July 25, the official music video of "Closer to You" was released.

On July 30, "Closer to You" music video behind photos of Sehun were released. On July 31, behind photos of Chanyeol of "Closer to You" music video were released. On August 1, "Closer to You" behind photos of the duo together were released.

Live performance 
EXO-SC performed "Closer to You" for the first time on Exo's 5th concert EXO Planet #5 - EXplOration on July 19, and will continue to do so for all the concerts in the tour.

On July 22, EXO-SC performed "Closer to You" at their two showcases for the press and for the fans.

Charts

Release history

References 

2019 songs
2019 singles
Korean-language songs
SM Entertainment singles